Piz d'Urezza (2,906 m) is a mountain of the Albula Alps, located west of Zernez in the canton of Graubünden. It lies east of Piz Sarsura, on the range between the Val Sarsura and the Val Pülschezza.

References

External links
 Piz d'Urezza on Hikr

Mountains of the Alps
Mountains of Graubünden
Mountains of Switzerland